The following are the national records in Olympic weightlifting in Wallis and Futuna. Records are maintained in each weight class for the snatch lift, clean and jerk lift, and the total for both lifts by the Fédération Française d'Haltérophilie, Musculation, Force Athlétique et Culturisme (FFHMFAC).

Current records

Men

Women

References

External links

Wallis and Futuna
Wallis and Futuna
Olympic weightlifting